

Incumbents 
President: Zviad Gamsakhurdia (until 6 January 1992)
Head of State: Eduard Shevardnadze (since 4 November 1992)
Prime Minister:
Besarion Gugushvili (until 6 January 1992)
Tengiz Sigua (since 6 January 1992)
Chairperson of the Parliament:
Akaki Asatiani (until 6 January 1992)
Eduard Shevardnadze (since 4 November 1992)

Events

January 
January 1 – 1991–1992 Georgian coup d'état: The opposition forces capture the Broadcasting Tower of Tbilisi, allowing them to control televised messages.
January 2 – 1991–1992 Georgian coup d'état: In a televised address, the opposition leaders announce the establishment of a Military Council, an interim body that would serve as the new leadership of the country. The Military Council dissolves the Supreme Council, removes President Zviad Gamsakhurdia from office, appoints Tengiz Sigua as an acting prime minister and declares state of emergency and curfew in Tbilisi.
January 3 – 1991–1992 Georgian coup d'état: Pro-Gamsakhurdia demonstration in Tbilisi is violently dispersed by the Mkhedrioni troops, killing four.
January 6 – 1991–1992 Georgian coup d'état: Zviad Gamsakhurdia leaves the Parliament through the road behind the building and flees to Armenia.
January 13 – Zviad Gamsakhurdia leaves Armenia for Chechnya, where he is greeted by the Chechen President Jokhar Dudayev.
January 19 – Georgia's breakaway South Ossetia holds the independence referendum. Georgian population of the region boycotts the referendum.

February 
February 2 – Pro-Gamsakhurdia demonstration is violently dispersed in Tbilisi, leaving 23 killed and 183 injured.
February 21 – The Military Council announces the restoration of the constitution of the Democratic Republic of Georgia.

March 
March 7 – Eduard Shevardnadze returns to Georgia.
March 10 – The Military Council hands over power to the State Council with Shevardnadze as its chairman.
March 25 – James Baker III, US secretary of state, arrives in Georgia, greeted by members of the Presidium of the Georgian State Council.

April

May

June 
June 24 – Sochi agreement marks the end of the South Ossetian War.
June 24 – Georgian Civil War: Armed Gamsakhurdia supporters seize the state television center in Tbilisi. They are driven out within a few hours by the National Guard.

July 
July 9 – Georgian Civil War: Deputy Prime Minister Sandro Kavsadze is kidnapped by pro-Gamsakhurdia partisans in Mingrelia.
July 14 – A peacekeeping operation begins in South Ossetia, consisting of a Joint Control Commission and joint Russian – Georgian – Ossetian military patrols.
July 23 – Georgian-Abkhazian conflict: The Abkhazian Supreme Soviet adopts the Soviet Abkhazian constitution of 1925, which recognizes Abkhazia as a sovereign (union) republic.
July 25 – Georgian-Abkhazian conflict: Georgian State Council declares Abkhazian proclamation of independence as illegal.
July 31 – Georgia is admitted to the United Nations.

August 
August 2 – Georgian Civil War: The State Council publishes a Manifesto of Reconciliation and amnesties all oppositionists imprisoned between January and June 1992 in an attempt to defuse tensions.
August 12 – Georgian Civil War: The Georgian National Guard and associated paramilitary forces enter Mingrelia to pursue a counter-insurgency; Rumors spread that kidnapped Georgian officials, including Sandro Kavsadze, are held in the Gali Raion of eastern Abkhazia.
August 14 – The Georgian National Guard and police enter Abkhazia to free the hostages; Shevardnadze claims to have reached an informal agreement with the Chairman of the Supreme Soviet of Abkhazia Vladislav Ardzinba about relocation of troops.
August 14 – War in Abkhazia: The Georgian National Guard and the Abkhazian National Guard clash near Ochamchire, both sides trade accusations over opening fire. The War in Abkhazia begins.
August 18 – War in Abkhazia: The Georgian National Guard captures Sokhumi; The Georgian flag is raised on the Council of Ministers buildings as Ardzinba flees for Gudauta.
August 19 – War in Abkhazia: Georgian troops enter and take the towns of Leselidze and Gagra, landing from the sea.
August 22 – War in Abkhazia: Confederation of Mountain Peoples of the Caucasus declares war against Georgia.
August 22 – War in Abkhazia: Abkhazian-North Caucasian forces try to cross the Gumista River but are stopped by the Georgian National Guard.

September 
September 3 – War in Abkhazia: A ceasefire agreement is signed in Moscow which leaves the Georgian government in control of most of Abkhazia but obliges it to withdraw a large part of its troops and hardware from Gagra and its environs.
September 25 – the Supreme Council of the Russian Federation adopts a resolution which denounces Georgia's policy in Abkhazia. Russia suspends the delivery of weapons and equipment to Tbilisi. Georgia's leadership accuses Russia of interference in Georgia's internal affairs.

October 
October 1 – War in Abkhazia: The combined Abkhaz and North Caucasian forces commanded by Chechen warlord Shamil Basayev resume hostilities and launch an offensive in Gagra.
October 6 – War in Abkhazia: Abkhazian-North Caucasian forces take whole Gagra Raion; Georgia accuses Russia of assisting the separatists.
October 11 – 1992 Georgian general election: Shevardnadze is elected as the Head of State.
October 11 – War in Abkhazia: A Georgian contingent lays siege to Tkvarcheli.

November 
November 30 – War in Abkhazia: Abkhazian-North Caucasian forces take Kochara.

December 
December 25 –  The Supreme Council of the Russian Federation recommends Russian president and government to impose sanctions on Georgia for failing to maintain security of Russian citizens and property of Russian Federation on its territory; Georgia accuses Russia of getting involved in the War in Abkhazia.

Deaths 

 
Georgia
Years of the 21st century in Georgia (country)
1990s in Georgia (country)
Georgia
Georgia